Phoenix acaulis (acaulis, Latin, trunkless) the dwarf date palm or stemless date palm, is a species of flowering plant in the palm family, native to northern India, Bhutan and Nepal.  Found in altitudes from 350 to 1500 m, Phoenix acaulis grows in scrubland, savannas and in pine forests.  Trunks in this species remain underground or, at most, grow to a few inches in height.  Leaves are 1.5 m long, gray-green, with 25 cm, pinnately arranged leaflets on short, armed petioles.

References

External links

Kew Plant List
IPNI Listing

acaulis
Flora of the Indian subcontinent
Plants described in 1820